Aitzaz Hasan Shaheed High School, formerly "Government High School Ibrahim Zai", is a government secondary school in the community of Hangu, within Hangu District, Khyber Pakhtunkhwa, Pakistan.

The school gained fame after Aitzaz Hasan—a 15-year-old student of this school—tackled a suicide bomber at the entrance gates of the school on January 6, 2014, and was fatally injured when the attacker detonated his explosive vest. His sacrifice saved the lives of hundreds of students of the school. On January 14, the chief minister's representatives announced that the school was renamed after him.

See also
 Education in Pakistan

References

High schools in Pakistan
Schools in Khyber Pakhtunkhwa